Tomoglossa is a genus of beetles belonging to the family Staphylinidae.

The genus was described in 1856 by Ernst Gustav Kraatz.

The species of this genus are found in Europe and Northern America.

Species:
 Tomoglossa aegyptiaca Scheerpeltz, 1963
 Tomoglossa arizonica Gusarov, 2002

References

Aleocharinae